Purya Fayazi Damnabi, (born 12 January 1993 in Tehran) is an Iranian volleyball player who plays as an outside spiker for the Iranian national team and Iranian team Shahrdari Urmia.

Sporting achievements
 AVC Asian Club Championship
  Philippines 2014 – with Matin Varamin1
  Chinese Taipei 2019 – with Shahrdari Varamin
1 On loan in Matin Varamin
 National championships
 2011/2012  Iranian Championship, with Saipa Alborz
 2013/2014  Iranian Championship, with Shahrdari Urmia
 2014/2015  Iranian Championship, with Shahrdari Urmia
 2015/2016  Iranian Championship, with Sarmayeh Bank Tehran
 2018/2019  Iranian Championship, with Shahrdari Varamin
 2020/2021  Iranian Championship, with Shahrdari Urmia
 National team
 2008  AVC Asian U18 Championship
 2009  FIVB U19 World Championship
 2014  AVC Asian Games
 2015  AVC Asian Championship
 2015  AVC Asian U23 Championship
 2019  AVC Asian Championship

Individually
The Best Scorer: 2008 Asian U18 Championship
The Most Valuable Player: 2015 Asian U23 Championship
The Best Outside Spiker: 2015 Asian U23 Championship
The Best Outside Spiker: 2015 Asian Championship

References

External links
Purya Fayazi  on Instagram
FIVB profile
PlusLiga player profile

1993 births
Living people
People from Tehran
Iranian men's volleyball players
Asian Games gold medalists for Iran
Asian Games medalists in volleyball
Volleyball players at the 2014 Asian Games
Medalists at the 2014 Asian Games
Iranian expatriate sportspeople in Poland
Outside hitters
21st-century Iranian people